George Shipton (1839 – 14 October 1911) was a prominent British trade unionist.

Trade union activity
Shipton worked as a builder and became involved in trade unionism by joining the Land and Labour League, where he became a strong supporter of George Odger.  In 1872, he was elected as the General Secretary of the London Trades Council.  In 1873, he became the first leader of the London Amalgamated Painters union, a post he held until 1889.

In 1878, Shipton travelled to Paris, leading the English delegation at an early international labour conference.  In February 1880, he stood as an independent Radical candidate in a by-election in Southwark coming third with 799 votes.

The Labour Standard
The London Trades Council had broken links with The Bee-Hive, their previous journal, in 1865, and it had ceased publication in 1878.  In 1881, they resolved to establish their own newspaper, The Labour Standard, and named Shipton as its editor.  He initially ran with a series of lead articles by Friedrich Engels.  He resigned in 1884, being replaced by William Barnett.

In 1885, Shipton was elected as the Secretary of the Parliamentary Committee of the Trades Union Congress (TUC), the post which later became the General Secretary.

New Unionism
In the late 1880s, Shipton opposed the New Unionism. Although the universal franchise was some years off, he claimed that "when the people were unenfranchised, were without votes, the only power left to them was the demonstration of numbers. Now, however, the workmen have votes." In 1890, Tom Mann and Ben Tillett, proponents of the New Unionism wrote a document entitled The "NEW" Trade Unionism: a reply to Mr George Shipton. He was defeated for the Secretaryship of the Parliamentary Committee of the TUC, but remained the Secretary of the London Trades Council until 1896.

Other activities
Shipton was co-opted as a member of the London School Board on 18 December 1890, but stood down at the next elections, in 1891.

References

1839 births
1911 deaths
General Secretaries of the Trades Union Congress
Members of the London School Board
Members of the Parliamentary Committee of the Trades Union Congress